Coleophora turbatella is a moth of the family Coleophoridae. It is found in Spain.

The wingspan is about 10 mm.

The larvae feed on Carex brevifolia.

References

turbatella
Moths of Europe
Moths described in 1944